Miranda's Victim is a 2023 American biographical crime drama directed by Michelle Danner and starring Abigail Breslin, Luke Wilson, Andy Garcia and Donald Sutherland. It is based on the life of Patricia "Trish" Weir, who was kidnapped and raped by Ernesto Miranda in 1963. The film also depicts the origin of the Miranda warning.

Cast
Abigail Breslin as Trish Weir
Luke Wilson as Lawrence Turoff
Andy García as Alvin Moore
Donald Sutherland as Judge Laurance T. Wren
Ryan Phillippe as John J. Flynn
Kyle MacLachlan as Chief Justice Earl Warren
Mireille Enos as Zeola
Taryn Manning as Twila Hoffman
Emily VanCamp as Ann Weir
Sebastian Quinn as Ernesto Miranda
Enrique Murciano as Detective Cooley
Brent Sexton as Sergeant Nealis
Josh Bowman as Charles

Production
In May 2022, it was announced that Breslin, Wilson, Sutherland and Garcia were cast in the film.  In June 2022, it was announced that Phillippe, MacLachlan, Enos and Manning were added to the cast.

Filming began in New Jersey in June 2022.  The film was shot in Middletown Township, New Jersey, Red Bank, New Jersey and at Monmouth University.

Showings
The film had its world premiere at the Santa Barbara International Film Festival on Wednesday, February 8, 2023 at the Arlington Theatre in Santa Barbara, California

Reception
Liselotte Vanophem of OC Movies, TV & Streaming Reviews gave the film a positive review and wrote, "This movie might feel small in size, but it’s massive in what it achieves. With a stunning Breslin in the lead and a heart-breaking and real-life story that everyone needs to hear, every film festival should include Danner’s latest movie in its program."

References

External links
 

2023 films
Films shot in New Jersey
American films based on actual events
American biographical drama films
American crime drama films